David Nalbandian defeated the two-time defending champion Roger Federer in the final, 6–7(4–7), 6–7(11–13), 6–2, 6–1, 7–6(7–3) to win the singles tennis title at the 2005 Tennis Masters Cup.

Mariano Puerta's round-robin result was disqualified upon his doping charge in December 2005.

Seeds

Alternates

Draw

Finals

Red group
Standings are determined by: 1. number of wins; 2. number of matches; 3. in two-players-ties, head-to-head records; 4. in three-players-ties, percentage of sets won, or of games won; 5. steering-committee decision.

Gold group
Standings are determined by: 1. number of wins; 2. number of matches; 3. in two-players-ties, head-to-head records; 4. in three-players-ties, percentage of sets won, or of games won; 5. steering-committee decision.

See also
ATP World Tour Finals appearances

External links
Singles Draw
Round robin Draw (Red Group)
Round robin Draw (Gold Group)

Singles